John McLevy (born 2 January 1927, Dundee, Scotland – died 27 November 2002) was a Scottish jazz trumpeter.

He played in Europe for Benny Goodman in the 1970s, alongside George Masso, Hank Jones and Slam Stewart. He performed with artists such as Max Bygraves, Roy Williams, accordionist Jack Emblow and later in a duo with veteran trumpeter Tommy McQuater.

References

1927 births
2002 deaths
Musicians from Dundee
Scottish jazz trumpeters
Male trumpeters
Place of death missing
20th-century trumpeters
20th-century British male musicians
British male jazz musicians